, born 12 July 1959) is a Japanese film and television actress, and singer.

Acting career

She has appeared in such television series and TV movies as the Red Dead Wagon series, Hôigaku kyôshitsu no jiken file, Kagemusha Tokugawa Ieyasu, Sotohiro, Kâdo G-men Kobayakawa Akane, Yonimo kimyô na monogatari: Aki no tokubetsu hen, Pretty Girls, Tenka, Stewardess monogatari, Yokomizo Seishi shirîzu, Kuroi fukuin: Shinpu no giwaku, Keiji kun, Gokinjo tantei satsukino satsuki: Gomi to batsu, Hotelier, Nurse Aoi: Special, Hidarime Tantei EYE, Onna kakekomi dera Keiji: Ooishi Mizuho 2, and Fukuie keibuho no aisatsu. She has appeared in such feature films as Aoi sanmyaku, Torakku yarô: Dokyô ichiban hoshi, Trick: The Movie 2, The Visitor in the Eye and Love Is a Hunter.

References

External links

1959 births
Living people
Japanese film actresses
Japanese television actresses